Curtina is a village in the Tacuarembó Department of northern-central Uruguay.

Geography
The Arroyo Malo passes by the south side of the town.

History
On 5 July 1907, the group of houses formerly known as "San Máximo" was elevated to the status of "Pueblo" (village) by the Act of Ley Nº 3.189. It was the head of the judicial section of "Arroyo Malo".

Population
In 2011 Curtina had a population of 1,037.
 
Source: Instituto Nacional de Estadística de Uruguay

Places of worship
The village has a church called Capilla Santa Teresita.

Notable people
 Numa Moraes, Musician
 Guillermo Castro Duré, Musician

References

External links
INE map of Curtina

Populated places in the Tacuarembó Department